Stanley Kao (born 16 May 1953) is a Taiwanese diplomat.

Early life
Born 16 May 1953 in Taipei, Kao obtained his bachelor's degree in political science from National Taiwan University in 1975 and master's degree in international law and diplomacy from National Chengchi University (NCCU) in 1980.

Career
After graduating from NCCU, Kao began working for the Ministry of Foreign Affairs (MOFA) in 1980. He was sent to the Taipei Economic and Cultural Representative Office (TECRO) in Honolulu, Hawaii, and later assigned to  TECRO in Atlanta, Georgia in 1993. Kao then became an adviser to TECRO in Malaysia. From 1996 to 1997, he was a fellow at Harvard University's Center for International Affairs. By 2000, Kao had become the deputy director general of MOFA's North American affairs department. He was promoted to director general of that division some time the next year. In 2002, he was appointed deputy representative of the Republic of China to the World Trade Organization. Kao then served as the deputy representative to the United States, beginning in 2004. He was named representative to Hungary in November 2007, and took office on 1 February 2008. After his stint in Hungary, Kao was named the Director General for Economic Affairs and International Cooperation in 2010. Kao was appointed the ROC representative to Italy in 2013. On 23 May 2016, he was appointed as the ROC representative to the United States. Kao made his first official trip to the United States on 5 June, prior to a swearing-in ceremony held on 2 August. Kao was replaced in June 2020, when the Tsai Ing-wen presidential administration named Hsiao Bi-khim to the post.

Personal life
Kao is married to Sherry Sung, with whom he has one daughter.

References

1953 births
Living people
National Chengchi University alumni
Representatives of Taiwan to Italy
National Taiwan University alumni
Representatives of Taiwan to the United States
Representatives of Taiwan to Hungary
People from Taipei